Dorbod Mongol Autonomous County is a county in the west of Heilongjiang

province, China, bordering Jilin province to the southwest. It is under the jurisdiction of the prefecture-level city of Daqing. It was known as Dorbod Banner before 1956 and Taikang County during Republican period.

Administrative divisions 
Dorbod Mongol Autonomous County is divided into 5 towns and 6 townships. 
5 towns
 Taikang, Hujitumo, Yantongtun, Talaha, Lianhuanhu
6 townships
 Yixin, Ke'ertai, Aolinxibo, Bayanchagan, Yaoxin, Jiangwan

Demographics 

It is named after the Dörbed Mongols.

Climate

References

External links 
  Government site -

See also 

 Eastern Dorbet

Dorbod
Mongol autonomous counties
Daqing